Larysa Varona, also known as Larisa Varona, (born 22 January 1983) is a Belarusian cross-country skier, biathlete, and rower. She has represented Belarus at the Paralympics in 4 Winter Paralympics competing in cross-country skiing and biathlon events (2006, 2010, 2014 and 2018) and in a single Summer Paralympics event during the 2012 Summer Paralympics competing in the rowing event.

Biography 
Larysa Varona was born with a locomotor impairment on 22 January 1983. She started skiing at the age of eleven.

Career 
She made her Paralympic debut for Belarus at the 2006 Winter Paralympics at the age of 23 and managed to claim a silver medal in her maiden Paralympic event in the women's cross-country skiing 3 × 2.5 km relay open category becoming the youngest medalist for Belarus at the Winter Paralympics (at the age of 23). Varona also competed at the 2010 Winter Paralympics clinching 2 bronze medals in the women's cross-country skiing 3 x 2.5 km relay open and women's cross-country skiing 5km classic events. She also participated in the 2014 Winter Paralympics but did not achieve any medals in the competition.

Varona also took part in international rowing competitions and got the opportunity to represent Belarus at the 2012 Summer Paralympics and competed in the mixed coxed four event.

References

External links 
 
 

1983 births
Living people
Belarusian female cross-country skiers
Belarusian female biathletes
Belarusian female rowers
Cross-country skiers at the 2006 Winter Paralympics
Cross-country skiers at the 2010 Winter Paralympics
Cross-country skiers at the 2014 Winter Paralympics
Biathletes at the 2006 Winter Paralympics
Biathletes at the 2014 Winter Paralympics
Biathletes at the 2018 Winter Paralympics
Rowers at the 2012 Summer Paralympics
Paralympic cross-country skiers of Belarus
Paralympic biathletes of Belarus
Paralympic rowers of Belarus
Paralympic silver medalists for Belarus
Paralympic bronze medalists for Belarus
Medalists at the 2006 Winter Paralympics
Medalists at the 2010 Winter Paralympics
Paralympic medalists in cross-country skiing